More Tomorrow may refer to:
 More Tomorrow, Belize, a village in Cayo District, Belize
 "More Tomorrow", an award-winning short story by Michael Marshall Smith
 More Tomorrow & Other Stories, a collection of short stories by Michael Marshall Smith